These are the official results of the Men's 4x400 metres event at the 1982 European Championships in Athens, Greece, held at Olympic Stadium "Spiros Louis" on 10 and 11 September 1982.

Medalists

Results

Final
11 September

Heats
10 September

Heat 1

Heat 2

Participation
According to an unofficial count, 50 athletes from 12 countries participated in the event.

 (4)
 (4)
 (4)
 (4)
 (4)
 (5)
 (4)
 (4)
 (4)
 (4)
 (5)
 (4)

See also
 1978 Men's European Championships 4 × 400 m Relay (Prague)
 1980 Men's Olympic 4 × 400 m Relay (Moscow)
 1983 Men's World Championships 4 × 400 m Relay (Helsinki)
 1984 Men's Olympic 4 × 400 m Relay (Los Angeles)
 1986 Men's European Championships 4 × 400 m Relay (Stuttgart)
 1987 Men's World Championships 4 × 400 m Relay (Rome)
 1988 Men's Olympic 4 × 400 m Relay (Seoul)
 1990 Men's European Championships 4 × 400 m Relay (Split)

References

 Results

4 x 400 metres relay
4 x 400 metres relay at the European Athletics Championships